Ania Loomba is an Indian literary scholar who works as a professor at the University of Pennsylvania. Her work focuses on colonialism and postcolonial studies, race and feminist theory, contemporary Indian literature and culture, and early modern literature. She studied at the University of Delhi, where she received her BA, MA and MPhil degrees, before moving to England to study at the University of Sussex, where she received her PhD.

Published works 
 Gender, Race, Renaissance Drama (1989)
 Colonialism/ Postcolonialism (1998)
 Post-colonial Shakespeares (1998) (co-editor)
 Shakespeare, Race, and Colonialism (2002)
 Postcolonial Studies and Beyond (2005) (co-editor)
 Race in Early Modern England: A Documentary Companion (2007) (co-editor)
 South Asian Feminisms (2012) (co-editor)
 Rethinking Feminism in Early Modern Studies: Gender, Race and Sexuality (2016)

References

External links 
 The Violence of Gandhi's Non-violence. Talk at Penn Humanities Forum on Violence, 2013-2014. October 2, 2013.

Living people
Year of birth missing (living people)
Indian women political writers
American women writers
University of Pennsylvania faculty
American women academics
21st-century American women